Cape Baba (Turkish:Baba Burnu) can refer to one of two capes in Turkey:

Cape Baba, the westernmost point of Anatolia
A cape near Karadeniz Eregli